Rapulana Seiphemo (born 4 November 1967) is a South African actor and filmmaker. He is primarily known for his role as Tau Mogale in the long-running soap opera Generations and its continuation, Generations: The Legacy.

Early life
He was born & raised in Meadowlands, Gauteng, South Africa.

Career
His career began back in 1989. He has also had starring roles in How to Steal 2 Million, Tsotsi and the sports drama Themba. He made a move from Generations: The Legacy to join Mzansi Magic's telenovela The Queen in early 2020.
Rapulana Seiphemo and His well known business Partner Kenneth Nkosi started a production company called Stepping Stone Pictures back in 2003 which they ran until 2015. Under Stepping Stone Pictures, they produced and starred in a film titled Paradise Stop. They produced a 13 part drama series for SABC 1 called Task Force as well as numerous content for Mzanzi Magic including Laugh Out Loud (LOL) and they own a school called Fumba Academy for Acting.

Filmography

Television

Film

Awards and nominations

Personal life
Rapulana Seiphemo is married to Olga Ruberio since 2003.
In February 2016 he was involved in a car accident and was hospitalized.

References 

1967 births
Living people
South African male actors
People from Soweto